Joel Landau is an American entrepreneur and health care expert. He is the founder of the Allure Group, which specializes in purchasing and improving nursing homes and rehabilitation facilities in the United States that are in danger of closing, and AlphaCare company.

Early life and education
Landau was born and raised in Monroe, New York. He studied at the United Talmudical Academy and graduated in 1999. He belongs to the Satmar Hasidic community.

Allure Group
Landau and his co-founders created The Allure Group to rescue skilled nursing homes that were in desperate need of improvement, and would otherwise face closure. Landau became involved in the nursing home industry after his own family experiences. After attempting to find suitable care for his grandfather, he stated in an interview that he noticed local nursing homes lacked resources to provide quality care. Following this experience, Landau and The Allure Group purchased the bankrupt Victory Memorial Hospital in Bay Ridge, Brooklyn in 2010, and developed the site into what is now known as the Hamilton Park Nursing and Rehabilitation Center.

This early success led Landau to purchase more New York City-based nursing homes and begin to improve the physical plants, staffing and overall state of these facilities. He subsequently purchased others including two Brooklyn-based nursing homes in 2011 and 2012.

Landau and The Allure Group also purchased The Cabs Nursing Home in Brooklyn, New York in early 2015. The four-story, 111-room facility sold for $15.6 million. Later that year, Landau and The Allure Group purchased Rivington House, a non-performing and nearly vacant AIDS/HIV specialty nursing home located on the Lower East Side of Manhattan for $28 million. The deed to the sale included a covenant that prevented the property from being developed like many of the buildings in the same district, stating that the building had to be used for non-profit residential health care. Despite this, the restriction was removed by the city of New York, which allowed Landau to sell the property for $116 million to developers in 2017. The sale was approved despite Landau owing $6 million in back taxes to the city. The transaction was approved by New York City Deputy Mayor, Tony Shorris without the knowledge of Mayor Bill de Blasio. After it was determined that plans for Rivington's redevelopment into luxury housing were developed before the sale had closed, an investigation was commenced by the New York Attorneys General. In 2018, Landau agreed to pay $2 million in penalties and charitable donations to local nonprofits in a deal with New York State Attorney General Eric Schneiderman related to the Rivington sale.

Other ventures

AlphaCare
In 2012, Landau co-founded AlphaCare. The concept of the business is to insure and provide community based long term care and support services for high risk elderly individuals who reside in the New York City area. AlphaCare was one of 25 businesses with a state license to provide care to Medicare dual eligible citizens. By 2017, AlphaCare had changed to become a one product provider and required individuals to have Medicaid and not Medicare as they did previously. He is a member of the Forbes New York Business Council and occasionally writes for the magazine.

References

External links
 JoelLandau.com

Year of birth missing (living people)
Living people
American health care businesspeople
American Orthodox Jews